DR HD was a Danish high-definition television channel and DR's sixth licence-funded channel. The channel launched on 1 November 2009. All content on DR HD were in HD quality; no upscaled standard definition programmes were broadcast.

The channel was shut down on 28 January 2013 and replaced by DR3.

References

Defunct television channels in Denmark
Television stations in Denmark
Television channels and stations established in 2009
Television channels and stations disestablished in 2013